Acacia hemsleyi is a tree or shrub belonging to the genus Acacia and the subgenus Juliflorae that is endemic to tropical parts of northern Australia.

Description
It blooms from July to September producing yellow flowers. The evergreen phyllodes have a linear to narrowly elliptic and linear-oblanceolate shape and can be  slightly curved or straight.

Distribution
It is native to an area in the Kimberley region of Western Australia where it is found along riverbanks and rocky creek beds and around permanent water sources. The range of the species extends across the top end of the Northern Territory and into northern Queensland where it is also found on river beds and creek banks as well as sandy beaches in mangrove communities growing in gravelly sands.

See also
List of Acacia species

References

hemsleyi
Acacias of Western Australia
Plants described in 1917
Taxa named by Joseph Maiden
Flora of Queensland
Flora of the Northern Territory